Antoine Franckx (3 January 1909 – 23 January 1999) was a Belgian footballer. He played in two matches for the Belgium national football team in 1936.

References

External links
 

1909 births
1999 deaths
Belgian footballers
Belgium international footballers
Place of birth missing
Association football forwards